The Troopers Drum and Bugle Corps is a World Class competitive junior drum and bugle corps. Based in Casper, Wyoming, the Troopers was one of the thirteen founding member corps of Drum Corps International (DCI).

History

The early years
James E. "Jim" Jones, a Casper, Wyoming building contractor and a veteran of the World War II United States Army Air Forces founded the Troopers Drum and Bugle Corps in 1957 as an activity for local youth. In his own youth, Jones had won the American Legion individual snare drum championship while a member of Casper's Sons of the American Legion drum and bugle corps, in which he had also been the corps manager from age fifteen. He decided to name the new corps the Troopers to honor the 11th Ohio Cavalry Regiment, a United States Army unit stationed at Fort Caspar, Wyoming Territory, to protect supply trains during the Indian Wars of the 19th Century. In order to fund the new corps, Jones took out a $4,000 loan to purchase drums and bugles.

In its first season, the Troopers were sponsored by the Casper American Legion post, were strictly a parade corps, and made the corps' first appearance at the State American Legion Convention in Riverton, Wyoming. In 1958, the corps entered its first field competitions. As it was necessary for the Troopers to travel extensively to compete in drum and bugle corps competitions, Jones chartered passenger buses to carry the Troopers across and around the country on trips that would last for several weeks, making the corps a "touring corps", a concept that was unusual at the time.

Their first national contest was the 1961 American Legion Championships in Denver, where the corps finished fourth. The Troopers' first major victory was in the 1965 World Open in Bridgeport, Connecticut. In 1966, the Troopers won the VFW Nationals. In 1967, the Wyoming State Legislature designated the Troopers as Wyoming's Musical Ambassadors.

The corps won the CYO Nationals three years in a row, from 1968 to 1970. In 1970, they won their second VFW National Championship in Miami Beach, added their third CYO title in Boston, and appeared on national TV during the halftime of a Minnesota Vikings NFL game. In 1971, the Troopers were the stars of a television special, "The Troopers Are Coming", narrated by actor Walter Brennan.

The Drum Corps International era 
In 1971, at the urging of Jim Jones and Cavaliers founder Don Warren, the Blue Stars, Cavaliers, Madison Scouts, Santa Clara Vanguard, and the Troopers formed the Midwest Combine. This action was taken in reaction to the rigid, inflexible rules of the American Legion and VFW (the primary rule makers and sponsors of both corps and shows) and the low or nonexistent performance fees paid for appearing in the various competitions. The corps felt that not only were they having their creative potential as artistic performing groups stifled, but they were being financially starved. (A similar group of Eastern corps, the United Organization of Junior Corps, known as the "Alliance", was formed by the 27th Lancers, Garfield Cadets, Boston Crusaders, Blessed Sacrament Golden Knights, and Blue Rock.) The Combine members felt that the corps should be making their own rules, operating their own competitions and championships, and keeping the bulk of the profit that shows earned. For the 1971 season, the group of corps stuck together, offering show promoters the five corps as a package.
In 1972, the Troopers, along with the nine other corps from the Midwest Combine and the Alliance, plus the Anaheim Kingsmen, Argonne Rebels, and De La Salle Oaklands became the founding members of Drum Corps International, which remains as the current sanctioning body for junior corps in North America. At the first DCI World Championships in Whitewater, Wisconsin, the Troopers finished in sixth place. For DCI's first four years, Troopers were an annual finalists. Jim Jones retired as the Troopers' director in 1987.

In 2005, the DCI Board of Directors suspended the Troopers from competition for non-compliance with membership rules. The corps was inactive for the 2006 season, while they reorganized. On October 3, 2006, the Troopers were reinstated as a DCI Division I corps. The Troopers returned to competition for the 2007 season.

In 2021, corps director Kristy Jackson stepped down after facing allegations of gross negligence. Michael Gough replaced her in January of the same year.

Show summary (1972–2023)
Source:

Caption awards
At the annual World Championship Finals, Drum Corps International presents awards to the corps with the high average scores from prelims, semifinals, and finals in five captions. Prior to 2000 and the adoption of the current scoring format, the Troopers have won these captions:
 
High Visual Award
 1972, 1973, 1974
High Color Guard Award
1973

References

External links
Official website

Drum Corps International World Class corps
Casper, Wyoming
Musical groups established in 1957
1957 establishments in Wyoming